Fully Realized Humans is a 2020 American comedy film directed, produced, and edited by Joshua Leonard, from a screenplay by Leonard and Jess Weixler. It stars Leonard, Weixler, Tom Bower, Beth Grant, Michael Chieffo, Janicza Bravo, Erica Chidi Cohen, Zach Shields, Jennifer Lafleur and Ross Partridge.

The film premiered at the 2020 Florida Film Festival. It was previously scheduled to premiere at the 2020 Tribeca Film Festival, but the festival was postponed due to the COVID-19 pandemic. It is scheduled to be released on July 30, 2021, by Gravitas Ventures.

Plot
With less than a month until the birth of their first child, Jackie and Elliot embark on a madcap odyssey of self-discovery in attempt to rid themselves of the inherited dysfunction of their own upbringings.

Cast
 Joshua Leonard as Elliot
 Jess Weixler as Jackie
 Beth Grant as Tipper
 Tom Bower as Richard
 Michael Chieffo as Bob
 Erica Chidi Cohen as Maya
 Janicza Bravo as Mare
 Zach Shields as Zach
 Ross Partridge as Barry
 Jennifer Lafleur as Beatrice

Release
The film was shown virtually at the Florida Film Festival on August 8, 2020. It was previously scheduled to have its world premiere at the Tribeca Film Festival on April 18, 2020, but the festival was postponed due to the COVID-19 pandemic. It also screened virtually at the Nashville Film Festival starting October 1, 2020. In May 2021, Gravitas Ventures acquired distribution rights to the film, and set it for a July 30, 2021, release.

References

External links
 
 
 

2020 films
2020 comedy films
American comedy films
American pregnancy films
Films directed by Joshua Leonard
Films postponed due to the COVID-19 pandemic
2020s pregnancy films
2020s English-language films
2020s American films